Wang Lei (born July 11, 1988) is a Chinese pair skater. With Wang Xuehan, he is a bronze medalist at three Grand Prix events – 2014 Trophée Éric Bompard, 2014 Cup of China, and 2016 NHK Trophy – and the 2016 Chinese national champion. With earlier partner Zhang Yue, he is a two-time ISU Junior Grand Prix Final medalist, having won silver in 2008 and bronze in 2009.

Personal life 
Wang Lei was born on July 11, 1988, in Harbin, Heilongjiang, China.

Career

Single skating 
Wang started skating in 1993 after a sports club visited his kindergarten in order to recruit new members. He made his international debut competing as a single skater on the junior level. He finished 7th at two ISU Junior Grand Prix events.

Partnership with Zhang 
Wang teamed up with Zhang Yue in 2006. In the 2007–08 season, the pair won two bronze medals on the Junior Grand Prix (JGP) circuit and qualified to their first JGP Final. They made their senior Grand Prix debut at the 2007 Cup of China before placing 8th at the JGP Final in Gdańsk, Poland. Following the retroactive disqualification of gold medalists Vera Bazarova / Yuri Larionov due to a positive doping sample from Larionov, Zhang/Wang moved up to 7th place. They concluded their season at the 2008 World Junior Championships in Sofia, Bulgaria. Ranked 4th in the short and 7th in the free, they finished 7th overall which, combined with Dong Huibo / Wu Yiming's bronze medal result, allowed China to send three pairs to the 2009 event.

In the 2008–09 JGP series, Zhang/Wang won a bronze medal in Belarus and finished 5th in Mexico. They were awarded the silver medal at the JGP Final in Goyang, South Korea. At the 2009 World Junior Championships in Sofia, the pair placed 7th in the short, 8th in the free, and 8th overall. At the 2009 World Championships in Los Angeles, they ranked 14th in the short, 16th in the free, and 16th overall.

Zhang/Wang won silver medals at their 2009–10 JGP assignments, in Belarus and Germany, and qualified to the JGP Final in Tokyo, where they took the bronze medal. They finished 6th at the 2010 Four Continents Championships in Jeonju.

The pair won the bronze medal at the 2011 Winter Universiade in Erzurum, Turkey. They placed 9th at the 2011 Four Continents in Taipei, 13th at the 2011 Worlds in Moscow, and 9th at the 2012 Four Continents in Colorado Springs, Colorado. Their partnership ended in 2012.

Partnership with Wang Xuehan 
His partnership with Wang Xuehan began in 2012. The pair won the bronze medal at the 2013 Chinese Championships.

Making their Grand Prix debut, the Wangs placed fourth at the 2013 Cup of China. They finished fourth at the 2014 Chinese Championships.

The following season, the Wangs were awarded bronze at both of their Grand Prix events – 2014 Cup of China and 2014 Trophée Éric Bompard. They took the silver medal at the 2015 Chinese Championships.

In the 2015–16 season, the pair placed fifth at the 2015 Skate America and fourth at the 2015 Cup of China. They were selected to compete at their first ISU Championship – the 2016 Worlds in Boston. Ranked 15th in the short program and 14th in the free skate, they finished 15th overall.

They were fourth at the 2016 Cup of China and won the bronze medal at the 2016 NHK Trophy. Due to injury, they did not compete again until the 2018-19 Chinese National Games, where they placed second.

In September 2020, it was announced that Wang and Wang had split and that he was paired with Yu Xiaoyu.

Programs

With Wang Xuehan

With Zhang Yue

Single skating

Competitive highlights
GP: Grand Prix; Junior Grand Prix

Pairs with Wang Xuehan

Pairs with Zhang Yue

Men's singles

Detailed Results

With Wang

References

External links

 
 
 
 Tracings.net profile

1988 births
Living people
Chinese male pair skaters
Figure skaters from Harbin
Universiade medalists in figure skating
Universiade bronze medalists for China
Competitors at the 2011 Winter Universiade